High was an Indian rock group from Kolkata, established in 1974. It was the pioneer of Indian rock bands. It played in the 1970s and 1980s, disbanding in 1990. Although their music was heavily influenced by British and American rock acts like the Grateful Dead, Allman Brothers' Band, Pink Floyd and Traffic, it was in terms of their original compositions that the band gained a huge cult following.

The original line-up of the band comprised Dilip Balakrishnan (Rhythm Guitar, Keyboards, Harmonica and Vocals), Nondon Bagchi (Drums), Adi Irani (Lead Guitar) and Lew Hilt (Bass Guitar) with Balakrishnan’s lyrics and compositions comprising the bulk of the band’s original playlist over the years. Dwight Pattison also briefly played in the band.

In addition to songs like “Monkey Song” and “Shambhu” that achieved anthem-like status among followers, Balakrishnan and High were unique in that their discography boasted of 3 thematic rock operas – White Knight’s Tale (inspired by Lewis Carroll), The Tolkien Suite (based on the poems of JRR Tolkien) and The Winter Planet (about nuclear holocaust).

Although High disbanded with Balakrishnan’s death in 1990, the band has retained a cult following over the years. A collection of the band's recordings were released on the Saregama label in 2009.

Nondon Bagchi and Lew Hilt have regrouped periodically with other musicians (Shaukat Ali, Jeff Menezes and others) to bring back the music of High. The band was awarded the "Rerock Award for Lifetime Contribution to Indian Rock" in 2013.

Beginnings

Kolkata boasted a host of quality rock bands in the 60’s – these included The Cavaliers, The Flinstones and Calcutta-16 among others. The Cavaliers consisted of Neil Sen (Lead Guitar), Robin Sen (Drums), Peter Hyrapiet (Rhythm Guitar), and Patrick Doran (Lead Singer) who won the distinction of becoming one of the first Indian beat groups to cut an original single, “Love Is a Mango”, released by HMV. Calcutta-16 comprised John Brinnand (vocals), P.C. Mukherjee (Lead Guitar), Devdan Sen (Bass Guitar) and Nondon Bagchi (Drums).

In 1969, Dilip Balakrishnan who had earlier joined the Cavaliers left and augmenting Calcutta-16, formed a new quintet called Great Bear, the first truly progressive rock band in the city, who could not only do decent cover versions of the Beatles and Stones, Hendrix, Cream, Floyd and Led Zep but also composed their own material and drew a dedicated audience. The band received considerable encouragement from the Junior Statesman and went on to win the JS-Cordel Rock Contest. Their finest original work, The White Knight’s Tale, a 40-minute suite inspired by Lewis Carroll, premiered at Kala Mandir in 1972 at the legendary “Seagull Empire” show.

The Great Bear split up in 1972 with the departures of John Brinnand and Devdan Sen. In 1974, Balakrishnan and Bagchi teamed up with Lew Hilt (who had briefly joined the Great Bear as a bassist earlier on) and guitarist Adi Irani to create High.

References 

Indian rock music groups
Musical groups established in 1974
1974 establishments in West Bengal